Ray "Pablo" Falconer was an English reggae producer from Birmingham, England, active in the 1970s and 1980s.

Brother to Earl Falconer from UB40, Falconer produced many singles and albums for that band.

Falconer died in a car crash in Birmingham in 1987. Earl Falconer, who was driving, was sentenced to six months' imprisonment, for drunk driving, in June 1988.

Discography (partial)
UB40 - "Red Red Wine", 20 August 1983
UB40 - Labour of Love LP, 24 September 1983
UB40 - "Please Don't Make Me Cry", 15 October 1983
UB40 and Chrissie Hynde - "I Got You Babe", 3 August 1985
UB40 - Baggariddim LP, 14 September 1985
UB40 - "Don't Break My Heart", 26 October 1985
UB40 - Live at Hammersmith

References

External links
Ray 'Pablo' Falconer discography at Discogs

English reggae musicians
1987 deaths
Musicians from Birmingham, West Midlands
Road incident deaths in England
Year of birth missing